The African Women's classification is a women's classification, the one by which the best African women's team of the Cape Epic is determined. Since 2018, the leader of the African Women's classification wears the Absa African Women's Special Jersey.

Winners

Statistics

By rider

By duo

By nationality

References

External links
Past-winners

Cape Epic classifications and awards
Cycling jerseys